Artem Bruy (born 9 June 2003) is a Belarusian footballer who plays for Naftan Novopolotsk.

References

External links

2003 births
Living people
People from Dzyarzhynsk District
Sportspeople from Minsk Region
Belarusian footballers
Association football defenders
FC Minsk players
FC Orsha players
FC Dnepr Rogachev players
FC Naftan Novopolotsk players